Väike-Maarja is a small borough in Lääne-Viru County, Estonia. It is the administrative centre of Väike-Maarja Parish.

Väike-Maarja Church was initially built as a fortress church.

Climate

Notable people

Aile Asszonyi (born 1975), opera singer
Eda-Ines Etti (born 1981), singer 
Vello Jürna (1959–2007), opera singer
Alar Kotli (1904–1963), architect
Jakob Liiv (1859–1938), poet and writer
Georg Lurich (1876–1920), wrestler and strongman
Kersti Merilaas (1913–1986), poet and translator
Kuno Pajula (born 1924), cleric
Maie Kalda (1929–2013), literary scholar and critic
Priit Raik (1948–2008), composer, conductor and pedagogue
A. H. Tammsaare (1878–1940), writer, studied at Väike-Maarja parish school
Kaido Höövelson (born 1984), sumo wrestler known as Baruto Kaito

References

External links
Väike-Maarja Parish 

Boroughs and small boroughs in Estonia
Kreis Wierland